Adam C. Cliffe (June 25, 1869 – June 12, 1928) was a United States district judge of the United States District Court for the Northern District of Illinois.

Education and career

Born in Sycamore, Illinois, Cliffe received a Bachelor of Laws from Northwestern University Pritzker School of Law, then read law to enter the bar in 1897. He was in private practice of law in Sycamore from 1897 to 1920, and was also a member of the Illinois House of Representatives and the Illinois Senate. From January 3, 1917, he was President of the Illinois Senate. From 1920 to 1923 he was a Circuit Judge of the 16th Judicial Circuit of Illinois.

Federal judicial service

Cliffe was nominated by President Warren G. Harding on December 20, 1922, to the United States District Court for the Northern District of Illinois, to a new seat authorized by 42 Stat. 837. He was confirmed by the United States Senate on December 22, 1922, and received his commission the same day. His service terminated on June 12, 1928, due to his death.

References

Sources
 

1869 births
1928 deaths
People from Sycamore, Illinois
Northwestern University Pritzker School of Law alumni
Illinois state court judges
Members of the Illinois House of Representatives
Illinois state senators
Judges of the United States District Court for the Northern District of Illinois
United States district court judges appointed by Warren G. Harding
20th-century American judges
United States federal judges admitted to the practice of law by reading law